Federley is a surname. Notable people with the surname include: 

Alex Federley (1864–1932), Swedish-Finnish graphic artist
Fredrick Federley (born 1978), Swedish politician

See also
Fedderly
Federle